Rock for the Rainforest is a biennial (formerly annual) benefit concert held by the Rainforest Foundation Fund and Rainforest Foundation US, hosted by the organizations' founders Sting and his wife Trudie Styler, since 1991. In addition to the annual flagship concert, Sting holds other concerts and hosts other types of events to benefit the Rainforest Foundation. In addition to Sting, regular performers at the event include Elton John, Billy Joel, and James Taylor.

The event holds the Guinness World Record for the largest environmental fundraising event. By 1996, the concerts had raised over $6,000,000; by 2000, more than $11,000,000; by 2004, more than $20,000,000. Money is raised through corporate sponsorships, individual and group ticket sales, and related events like a benefit dinner and silent auction.

The event, which so far has always been held at Carnegie Hall in Midtown Manhattan, is a "spring tradition in New York" and a "fixture on the Manhattan charity circuit." At the 1997 and 2006 events, the Empire State Building was lighted green on the night of the concert.

The concert funds projects that benefit the indigenous peoples of the world's rainforests. The Rainforest Foundation Fund supports projects by three independent national organizations: Rainforest Foundation Norway, Rainforest Foundation US, and Rainforest Foundation UK. Kayapo chief Raoni delivered a ten-minute speech in his native language at the first concert, which was subsequently translated into English for the audience.

List of events

References

Benefit concerts in the United States
Carnegie Hall